Selg is a surname. Notable people with the surname include:

 Hanno Selg (1932–2019), Estonian modern pentathlete
 Peter Selg (born 1963), German psychiatrist

See also
 18565 Selg, minor planet
 Sels

Estonian-language surnames